Vârghiș may refer to the following places in Romania:

 Vârghiș, a commune in Covasna County
 Vârghiș, a tributary of the Olt in Harghita County
 Vârghiș (Cormoș), a tributary of the Cormoș in Harghita and Covasna Counties